Athletics contests were held at the 2007 Parapan American Games from August 13 to 19 at the João Havelange Stadium in Rio de Janeiro, Brazil.

Medal table
Brazil topped the medal table with a total of 73 medals.

Medalists

Men's events

Women's events

References

Events at the 2007 Parapan American Games
2007
Parapan American Games